Park Seong-nae (born 31 March 1964) is a South Korean rowing coxswain. He competed in the men's coxed four event at the 1988 Summer Olympics.

References

1964 births
Living people
South Korean male rowers
Olympic rowers of South Korea
Rowers at the 1988 Summer Olympics
Place of birth missing (living people)
Asian Games medalists in rowing
Rowers at the 1986 Asian Games
Asian Games bronze medalists for South Korea
Medalists at the 1986 Asian Games